The Galten Islands are a small group of islands in the eastern part of Magnet Bay, Antarctica,  west of Cape Davis. They were mapped by Norwegian cartographers from aerial photographs taken by the Lars Christensen Expedition, 1936–37, and called Galten (the boar). They were first visited in 1957 by an Australian National Antarctic Research Expeditions party led by B.H. Stinear.

See also 
 List of antarctic and sub-antarctic islands

References

Islands of Enderby Land